Live at Roadburn 2018 is the first live album by American singer-songwriter Zola Jesus, recorded at the 2018 Roadburn Festival in Tilburg, Netherlands. It was made available to stream and purchase via Bandcamp on May 1, 2020, before expanding to other digital platforms on May 8, 2020. It is scheduled to be released in physical formatsincluding several variations of limited edition vinyl, as well as compact discon June 26, 2020, by Sacred Bones Records.

Recording
The album was recorded April 21, 2018 at the 2018 Roadburn Festival after Zola Jesus was invited to perform that as part of a day curated by Jacob Bannon of the band Converge.

Release and formats
On May 2, 2020, the album was made available to purchase and stream digitally via Bandcamp, before being made available on other digital formats on May 8, 2020

In the United States, the album will be released on June 26, 2020, as a limited double vinyl LP, featuring a black and white spatter pattern, as well as a CD version. In Europe, the album will be available as a double vinyl LP in four variations, each limited to 200 pressings. A digipak CD edition is also slated to be released, limited to 1000 pressings.

Track listing

Personnel

Band members
Nika Danilovavocals, synthesizer
Alex DeGrootguitar, electronics
Louise Woodwardviola
Technical
Marcel van de Vondervoortrecording
James Plotkinmixing, mastering

Artwork
Oejerumfront cover
Maurice de Jongsleeve design

References

External links
 at Rate Your Music

2020 live albums
Live albums by American artists
Live industrial rock albums
Live gothic rock albums
Zola Jesus albums